Tori Kelly is an American singer, songwriter, record producer and actress who slowly gained recognition after starting to post videos on YouTube at the age of 14. When she was 16, Kelly auditioned for the singing competition television series American Idol. After being eliminated from the show, Kelly began to work on her own music. In 2012, she independently released her first EP that she produced, wrote, and mixed herself, titled Handmade Songs By Tori Kelly. The following year, Scooter Braun became her manager after seeing her videos on YouTube and introduced her to Capitol Records, with whom she signed in September. Kelly's second EP Foreword came out in October 2013 as her first major label release. On June 23, 2015, Kelly's debut album, Unbreakable Smile, was released. The lead single, "Nobody Love", was released in the spring and became her first US  Billboard Hot 100 appearance. Kelly was nominated for Best New Artist at the 58th Grammy Awards. She voiced a shy teenage elephant named Meena in the 2016 movie, Sing.

Her second studio album Hiding Place (2018) peaked at number 35 on the Billboard 200 chart and received two Grammy Awards, for Best Gospel Album and Best Gospel Performance/Song, respectively. In 2019, Kelly released her third studio album Inspired by True Events.

Released songs

References

Kelly, Tori